Cottage Industry is the first EP album by South Korean duo M&D, released by SM Entertainment and distributed KT Music on April 20, 2015.

It is their only release as M&D before changing their name.

Background and release 
On March 17 a few reports have come out to reveal that SM Entertainment mentioned that M&D's releasing their first EP album Cottage Industry on April 20 with "I Wish" as its lead track. Along with the already announced featuring of GFriend's Yerin, there were a number of other celebrities who made an appearances in it, such as Lee Jin Ho, Cho Jae Geol, Gun Hee, and Jang Dong-min. This is the project duo's comeback after a 3-year and 10-month hiatus following the release of the single "Close Ur Mouth". The release is an EP album with six tracks written by Heechul and composed by Jungmo.

Promotion 
Kim Heechul & Kim Jungmo began performing "I Wish" on South Korean music television programs (Music Bank) on April 17, 2015.

Track listing

Charts

Album charts and sales

Single

References

External links
 
 
 

SM Entertainment EPs
Korean-language EPs
2015 EPs
Kim Heechul & Kim Jungmo EPs